White Death is the fourth book in the NUMA Files series of books co-written by best-selling author Clive Cussler and Paul Kemprecos, and was published in 2003. The main character of this series is Kurt Austin.

White Death (The NUMA Files #4) 2004

Kurt Austin and the NUMA team a hero for the new millennium, Austin is the leader of NUMA's Special Assignments Team-and the threat before him now is definitely special. A confrontation between a radical environmentalist group and a Danish cruiser has forced Austin and colleague Joe Zavala to come to the rescue of a ship full of trapped men, but after the two save the crew with their experimental underwater rescue submersible they investigate further, they discover that something far more sinister is at work. It seems that a mysterious signal from an offsite operative remotely sent the organization Sentinel of the Seas (SOS) vessel and its leader the obnoxious Marcus Ryan and the organization's very attractive lawyer Therri Weld, who Kurt obviously takes an interest in, in to a collision course with a Danish frigate which was trying to keep the SOS boat from interfering with local seal harvesting operations and sending boat ships to the bottom.  On the Danish ship the Captain and 13 crew are trapped in an air bobble which is the reason Kurt and Joe come to the sight with their rescue vessel to save the trapped crew.
A shadowy multinational corporation, Oceanus, is attempting to wrest control of all the fish in the seas themselves-no matter what havoc results, and is killing anyone who attempts to stop them. And the story includes Nazis, Basque separatists, an outcast murderous tribe, the Kiolya, of Eskimos, Canadian natives in northern Quebec, environmental activists and the usual female sex interest.
When Austin is investigating an Oceanus remote shoreline fish farm, he finds a “frankenfish” and a load of armed guards.  As Kurt is making his way out of the secret caves the local widow Pia told him about his boat is blown up by a hand grenade and he only barely survives, it seems certain he was supposed to be the next in line to die, but he cannot stop now. He is saved by a rich Basque shipping tycoon Balthazar Aguirrez who is looking for ancient Basque relics to save off a war between the Spanish government and Basque separatists.  Kurt is in the middle of an environmental disaster caused by descendants of northern Eskimos’ who want to dominate the fish industry and in the end the world has already begun, and only he and NUMA stand in the way. 
Gamay and Paul Trout as well as Joe are involved in the action as the Trout's are investigating an Oceanus fish farm in north east Canada and they almost get killed when run off the road.  The conclusion happens at a lake in northern Canada where Oceanus has an operation to raise the fish to dominate the ocean and a recovered WW 2 German zeppelin which they will use to drop the fish into the seas.  Kurt and Joe with the assistance of the Aguirrez sons of Balthazar and his helicopters attack the island and release Ryan and Therri and the local natives being held prisoners and soon to be drowned in the lake. The zeppelin with the first load of fish and the head of the evil band takes off with Kurt and Joe hanging on the tie down lines and the brothers assure the captives get to safety and then they blow up the zeppelin hangar and fish pens by releasing hydrogen in the hangar and then setting off a hand grenade.
Kurt and Joe battle with the bad guys and take control of the zeppelin and drop the fish to die on the refueling station and then take the zeppelin over the Canadian fish farm and jumped into the ocean and are rescued by Gamay and Paul.  The zeppelin with the remaining bad guys heads out over the Atlantic to somehow ends up captured by NUMA and used by Kurt for his finally dinner date with Therri.
Kurt gets his date and Aguirrez gets his treasures and the bad guys are eliminated another completed mission.

A Novel from the NUMA files, A Kurt Austin Adventure.  In this novel, the main character Kurt Austin has to destroy an overpowered fish farm that makes mutant fish before the entire eco-system is changed.

2003 American novels
The NUMA Files
Environmental fiction books
G. P. Putnam's Sons books
Collaborative novels